James Fenwick Lansdowne,  (August 8, 1937 – July 27, 2008) was a self-taught Canadian wildlife artist.

Career
Lansdowne was born in Hong Kong of English parents and grew up in Victoria, British Columbia. Stricken with polio at eleven months, he was nurtured by his mother, Edith Lansdowne, to walk. A painter herself, she also provided his first lessons in painting and continued to supply whatever help she could. Later, in high school, the staff of the Royal British Columbia Museum encouraged him in studying birds, and gave him a job as a laboratory assistant for three summers. He held his first show in 1952 at the Royal British Columbia Museum when he was fourteen, his second show at the Royal Ontario Museum in 1956. He had his first international exhibition in New York in 1958 at the headquarters of the National Audubon Society. In 1960, he had an exhibition at the Art Gallery of Greater Victoria, then, in 1961, he had an exhibition at the Tryon Gallery (today`s Rountree Tryon Gallery) in London, England. From then on, he exhibited his work in centres world-wide.

Lansdowne`s creative process involved observation from life and from preserved specimens. His detailed watercolours of birds have frequently been compared with the work of John James Audubon - they often feature a specific species against a largely white background - but his subjects tend to display a greater lifelike quality and more natural postures than Audubon's. His work is in such public collections as the Royal Ontario Museum, the Montreal Museum of Fine Arts, the Beaverbrook Art Gallery, the Art Gallery of Greater Victoria and in the collection of the Princess Royal and Duke of Edinburgh. His work was presented to members of the British Royal Family by the Government of Canada.

In 1976, Lansdowne was made an Officer of the Order of Canada. In 1995, he was awarded the Order of British Columbia. In 1974, he was elected a member of the Royal Canadian Academy of Arts.

He died in Victoria, BC in 2008.

Personal life
Since Lansdowne had had polio, he walked with crutches and only could paint with his left hand.

Publications
 Birds of the Northern Forest (1966) - text by John A. Livingston
 Birds of the Eastern Forest, Volume I (1968) - text by John A. Livingston
 Birds of the Eastern Forest, Volume II (1970) - text by John A. Livingston
 Birds of the West Coast, Volume I (1976)
 Rails of the World (1977) - text by S. Dillon Ripley
 Guide to the Behavior of Common Birds (1980) with Donald Stokes
 Birds of the West Coast, Volume II (1982)

References

Bibliography

External links
 Examples of Lansdowne's work
 "An Artist Who Felt For All God's Creation" Times Columnist 28 July 2008
Order of British Columbia 1995 group photo

1937 births
2008 deaths
Artists from Victoria, British Columbia
Hong Kong painters
Members of the Order of British Columbia
Officers of the Order of Canada
Members of the Royal Canadian Academy of Arts
20th-century Canadian painters
Canadian male painters
21st-century Canadian painters
Canadian bird artists
20th-century Canadian male artists
21st-century Canadian male artists